This was the first edition of the event.

Laura Ioana Paar and Julia Wachaczyk won their first WTA titles, defeating Lesley Pattinama Kerkhove and Bibiane Schoofs in the final, 7–5, 6–4.

Seeds

Draw

Draw

References

External links
Main Draw

2020 Doubles
Lyon Open (WTA) - Doubles